Water for Elephants is a 2011 American romantic drama film directed by Francis Lawrence and written by Richard LaGravenese, based on Sara Gruen's 2006 novel of the same name. It stars Reese Witherspoon, Robert Pattinson, and Christoph Waltz.

The film was released in the United States on April 22, 2011. It received mixed reviews from film critics and grossed $117 million worldwide for a budget of $38 million.

Plot

Charlie O'Brien, a circus owner, encounters an elderly man named Jacob Jankowski, who is separated from his nursing home group. Jacob reveals he once had a career in the circus business and was present during one of the most infamous circus disasters of all time.

In 1931, when Jacob is a 23-year-old veterinary medicine student taking his final exam at Cornell University, he learns that his parents were killed in a car accident. After the bank forecloses on the family home and in the midst of the Great Depression, he jumps onto a passing circus train. Jacob meets Camel, an employee with the Benzini Bros., who agrees to help Jacob obtain a job. Jacob meets ringmaster August, who after learning of Jacob's veterinary background, hires him to care for the animals. Jacob meets August's wife, performer Marlena Rosenbluth, and informs her that their star show horse has laminitis.

August instructs Jacob to keep the horse performing as long as possible, but Jacob takes it upon himself to euthanize it. A furious August threatens to throw Jacob off the moving train to scare him into submission, but later expresses gratitude to Jacob for potentially saving Marlena from being injured by the sick horse. August soon procures Rosie, an Asian elephant, and assigns Jacob to train her. He invites Jacob to dinner with him and Marlena, where Jacob observes August's possessive treatment of his wife. After August passes out from drunkenness, Jacob and Marlena share a dance and nearly kiss.

Jacob attempts but fails to train Rosie, and August beats her with a bullhook when she fails to follow orders. After Rosie runs off and nearly injures Marlena during a show, August savagely beats her. Jacob, with help from Marlena, Camel and his roommate Walter, clean her wounds and give her buckets of whisky to numb her pain. They unexpectedly learn that Rosie understands Polish commands. Rosie begins to perform beautifully and the circus enjoys a short period of success.

Jacob and Marlena grow closer, and after escaping a prohibition raid at a restaurant, they kiss. Marlena expresses regret, while Jacob considers quitting but can't bear to leave Rosie with August. When August later observes their chemistry, he abuses Marlena and cruelly taunts them. Marlena discovers that August plans to throw Jacob from the train, and they run away together, hiding in a local hotel. They have sex but are ambushed by August's henchmen who drag Marlena away and beat up Jacob.

Jacob covertly returns to the circus train, finds Marlena, and nearly kills August with a knife while he sleeps. Marlena tells Jacob that Camel and Walter were thrown from the train and killed and that several circus employees have become fed up with August's murderous cruelty and betrayal. The following day, they unlock all of the animal cages while an audience watches Marlena and Rosie's performance. Jacob attempts to find Marlena in the chaos, but August attacks him. Marlena tries to save Jacob from being beaten by August, but this causes the latter to turn his fury on her. August strangles Marlena while Jacob fights with August's lead henchman. Two circus employees save Jacob, and Rosie hits August on the back of the head with an iron stake, killing him and rescuing Marlena. The Benzini Bros. circus is officially shut down, and no one is charged with releasing the animals.

Back in the present, Jacob explains to O'Brien that he and Marlena took Rosie and got jobs with the Ringling Bros. and Barnum & Bailey Circus. Jacob finished his degree and worked as a circus veterinarian while Marlena continued to perform with Rosie. They purchased a farm, married, had 5 children, and kept Rosie until her death. He took on a job as a vet at the Albany zoo, and after many happy years together, Marlena died peacefully. Not wanting to return to the lonely nursing home, Jacob asks for a job with the circus as a ticket taker, and O'Brien agrees.

Cast

 Reese Witherspoon as Marlena Rosenbluth
 Robert Pattinson as Jacob Jankowski
 Hal Holbrook as older Jacob Jankowski
 Christoph Waltz as August Rosenbluth
 Tai as Rosie, the elephant
 James Frain as Rosie's caretaker
 Paul Schneider as Charlie O'Brien
 Ken Foree as Earl
 Tim Guinee as Diamond Joe
 Mark Povinelli as Kinko/Walter
 Scott MacDonald as Blackie
 Jim Norton as Camel
 Richard Brake as Grady
 Sam Anderson as Mr. Hyde
 John Aylward as Mr. Ervin
 Brad Greenquist as Mr. Robinson 
 Uggie as Queenie, the terrier

Production

Filming
On a budget of $38 million, filming began on May 20, 2010, in Los Angeles, Piru, Fillmore in California, Chattanooga, Tennessee, Kensington and Chickamauga in Georgia. The filming wrapped up on August 4, 2010. This is the second time Witherspoon and Pattinson have costarred together as they had filmed a deleted scene from 2004's Vanity Fair in which he was her estranged son. Reshoots for the film were scheduled for mid January 2011.

The stampede scenes were digitally composed.

Controversy

Alleged animal abuse 
In the film Water for Elephants the elephant Rosie, whom Tai portrays, is severely abused. A spokesperson from the AHA assured people that all scenes of abuse in the film were the work of special effects and CGI, and that the moaning and crying sounds that Tai is seen making on film were audio tracks, and were not actually made by Tai.

Controversy erupted, however, regarding concerns Tai was mistreated prior to filming. A video released by the Animal Defenders International (ADI) in 2011 shows footage of Tai allegedly being shocked with handheld stun guns and beaten around the body and legs with bull hooks, while in the care of Have Trunk Will Travel in 2005. The ADI contacted AHA, urging them to re-evaluate how they assess the use of animals in films and the statements being made which effectively endorse the use of performing animals.

Have Trunk Will Travel responded to the video stating, "The video shows heavily edited and very short snippets, obviously taken surreptitiously six years ago, purporting mistreatment of our elephants. If there was truly any abuse going on why wait six minutes, much less six years?" and added "None of the footage being shown was taken during Tai's training for Water for Elephants."

Release

Critical response
On review aggregate Rotten Tomatoes, the film holds an approval rating of 60% based on 199 reviews, with an average rating of 6.10/10. The site's critical consensus reads, "It's a tale tastefully told and beautifully filmed, but Water for Elephants suffers from a pronounced lack of chemistry between its leads." Metacritic, which assigns a weighted mean rating to reviews, the film has a score of 52 out of 100, based on 35 critics, indicating "mixed or average reviews".

Roger Ebert of the Chicago Sun-Times gave the film three stars out of four, stating: "This is good sound family entertainment, a safe PG-13 but not a dumb one, and it's a refreshing interlude before we hurtle into the summer blockbuster season." Todd McCarthy of The Hollywood Reporter gave the film a positive review. He stated: "The Reese Witherspoon-Robert Pattinson film will please fans of Sara Gruen's best seller, but it lacks the vital spark that would have made the drama truly compelling on the screen."

Kenneth Turan of the Los Angeles Times gave the film a positive review, stating that "despite the stars' lack of romantic chemistry, there's much to enjoy in this cinematic retelling of Sara Gruen's big top bestseller, starting with the spectacular circus setting." James Berardinelli, film critic for ReelViews, wrote: "There's an old-fashioned vibe to Water for Elephants; it's the kind of movie Hollywood once turned out with regularity but rarely does anymore."

Richard Corliss of Time stated: "The proceedings get so slow and saccharine that viewers will relish the film's moments of redeeming idiocy. In one of them, Marlena whispers to Jacob, 'Bring Rosie to my tent and don't tell anyone' — as if the roustabouts wouldn't notice a 12-ft.-tall, 10,000-lb. creature striding down the midway. Granted, they'd also take a look at his handler, the divoon Robert Pattinson; but Rosie has a pretty strong odor too, and that's what will stick to you after seeing Water for Elephants."

Some critics, however, praised the film's cast. Mick LaSalle of the San Francisco Chronicle stated that Pattinson succeeded at holding his own at the center of a major feature and that Witherspoon, while an odd fit for the role, was "actress enough to make it work." He continued: "the affectionate but turbulent dynamic among [Christoph] Waltz, Pattinson and Witherspoon is endlessly watchable." Peter Travers of Rolling Stone also wrote that Pattinson and Witherspoon "smoldered" under the "golden gaze of Rodrigo Prieto's camera."

Box office
Water for Elephants was released in theaters on April 22, 2011. In the United States and Canada, the film was released theatrically in 2,817 conventional theaters. The film grossed $6,924,487 during its opening day on April 22, 2011, with midnight screenings in 2,817 locations. Overall the film made $16,842,353 and debuted at No. 3 on its opening weekend. On its second weekend, it dropped to No. 4 and grossed $9,342,413 - $3,313 per theater. By its third weekend it dropped down to No. 6 and made $6,069,603 - $2,322 per theater. As of September 27, 2011, its final gross is $58,709,717 in the United States and $58,385,185 overseas, for a total of $117,094,902.

Accolades

Home media
The film was released on Blu-ray and DVD on November 1, 2011, in two physical packages: a 1-disc DVD and 2-disc Blu-ray/Digital Copy combo pack. As of Nov 6, it has been on Direct TV Cinema.

References

External links

 
 
 
 
 
 WaterForElephantsFilm.com 

2011 films
2011 romantic drama films
American romantic drama films
Polish-language films
Adultery in films
Circus films
Films about elephants
Films based on American novels
Films based on Canadian novels
Films directed by Francis Lawrence
Films set in 1931
Films shot in California
Films shot in Georgia (U.S. state)
Films shot in Los Angeles
Films shot in Tennessee
Great Depression films
20th Century Fox films
Films scored by James Newton Howard
Dune Entertainment films
3 Arts Entertainment films
2010s English-language films
2010s American films